Tumor susceptibility gene 101, also known as TSG101, is a human gene that encodes for a cellular protein of the same name.

Function 
The protein encoded by this gene belongs to a group of apparently inactive homologs of ubiquitin-conjugating enzymes. The gene product contains a coiled-coil domain that interacts with stathmin, a cytosolic phosphoprotein implicated in tumorigenesis. The protein may play a role in cell growth and differentiation and act as a negative growth regulator. In vitro steady-state expression of this tumor susceptibility gene appears to be important for maintenance of genomic stability and cell cycle regulation. Mutations and alternative splicing in this gene occur in high frequency in breast cancer and suggest that defects occur during breast cancer tumorigenesis and/or progression.

The main role of TSG101 is to participate in ESCRT pathway. This pathway facilitates reverse topology budding and formation of multivesicular bodies (MVB) which delivers cargo destined for degradation to the lysosomes. TSG101 recognises short linear motif : P(T/S)AP via the UEV protein domain of the VPS23/TSG101 subunit. The assembly of the ESCRT-I complex is directed by the C-terminal steadiness box (SB) of VPS23, the N-terminal half of VPS28, and the C-terminal half of VPS37. The structure is primarily composed of three long, parallel helical hairpins, each corresponding to a different subunit. The additional domains and motifs extending beyond the core serve as gripping tools for ESCRT-I critical functions.

Viral Hijacking 

TSG101 plays an important role in the pathogenesis of HIV and other viruses.  In uninfected cells, TSG101 functions in the biogenesis of the multivesicular body (MVB), which suggests that HIV may bind TSG101 in order to gain access to the downstream machinery that catalyzes MVB vesicle budding.

Interactions 

TSG101 has been shown to interact with:
 EP300, 
 HGS, 
 LRSAM1, 
 P21,
 P53,  and
 VPS28.

Orthologue, Vps23 

In humans, the orthologue of vps23 which has a component of ESCRT-1 is called Tsg101. Mutations in Tsg-101 have been linked to cervical, breast, prostate and gastrointestinal cancers. In molecular biology, vps23 (vacuolar protein sorting) is a protein domain. Vps proteins are components of the ESCRTs (endosomal sorting complexes required for transport) which are required for protein sorting at the early endosome. More specifically, vps23 is a component of ESCRT-I. The ESCRT complexes form the machinery driving protein sorting from endosomes to lysosomes. ESCRT complexes are central to receptor down-regulation, lysosome biogenesis and  budding of HIV.

Structure 

Yeast ESCRT-I consists of three protein subunits, VPS23, VPS28, and VPS37. In humans, ESCRT-I comprises TSG101, VPS28, and one of four potential human VPS37 homologues.

See also 
FGI-104 - an ESCRT inhibitor being researched as a broad spectrum antiviral

References

Further reading